Octavo, a Latin word meaning "in eighth" or "for the eighth time", (abbreviated 8vo, 8º, or In-8) is a technical term describing the format of a book, which refers to the size of leaves produced from folding a full sheet of paper on which multiple pages of text were printed to form the individual sections (or gatherings) of a book. An octavo is a book or pamphlet made up of one or more full sheets (e.g. of A2 paper) on which 16 pages of text were printed, which were then folded three times to produce eight leaves. Each leaf of an octavo book thus represents one eighth the size of the original sheet. Other common book formats are folios and quartos. These terms are discussed in greater detail in book sizes.

Format
An octavo is a book or pamphlet made up of one or more full sheets of paper on which 16 pages of text were printed, which were then folded three times to produce eight leaves.  Each leaf of an octavo book thus represents one eighth the size of the original sheet.

There are many variations in how octavos were produced.  For example, bibliographers call a book printed as an octavo (eight leaves per full sheet), but bound in gatherings of 4 leaves each, an "octavo in 4s." 

The actual size of an octavo book depends on the size of the full sheet of paper on which it was printed.  The size of such sheets varied in different localities and times.  A sixteenth century octavo printed in France or Italy is about the size of a modern cheap paperback, whereas an eighteenth-century octavo printed in England is larger, about the size of a modern hardcover novel.

The Gutenberg Bible was printed as a folio in about 1455, in which four pages of text were printed on each sheet of paper, which were then folded once.  Several such folded conjugate pairs of leaves were inserted inside another to produce the sections or gatherings, which were then sewn together to form the final book. 

The oldest surviving octavo book apparently is the so-called "Turkish calendar" for 1455, presumably printed in late 1454, about the same time as the Gutenberg Bible. Numerous other octavos survive beginning from about 1461.  The British Library Incunabula Short Title Catalogue currently lists about 28,100 different editions of surviving books, pamphlets and broadsides (some fragmentary only) printed before 1501    of which about 2,850 are octavos, representing 10 percent of all works in the catalog.

Beginning in 1501, Aldus Manutius of Venice began to print classical works in small octavo format which were easily portable. These editions contained only the text of the works, without the commentary and notes, and became very popular with educated readers. As a result, Aldus became closely associated with the octavo format.

Size
Beginning in the mid-nineteenth century, technology permitted the manufacture of large sheets or rolls of paper on which books were printed, many text pages at a time. As a result, it may be impossible to determine the actual format (i.e., the number of leaves formed from each sheet fed into a press). The term "octavo" as applied to such books may refer simply to the size of the book. More specific sizes are denoted by reference to certain paper sizes as follows:

Foolscap octavo (6¾" by 4¼") (170 mm x 108 mm)
Crown octavo (7½" by 5") (190 mm x 126 mm)
Demy octavo (8¾" by 5⅝") (221 mm x 142 mm)
Globe octavo (? by ?)
Royal octavo (10" by 6¼") (253 mm x 158 mm)

See also

Book size
Bookbinding
Folio
Quarto
Paper size
Units of paper quantity

References

Book formats